Electronic Attack Squadron 133 (VAQ-133) is an EA-18G Growler squadron of the United States Navy based at Naval Air Station Whidbey Island, Washington. Beginning in 2013, the squadron began the transition from the EA-6B to the EA-18G.  Upon completion of the transition in spring of 2014, they returned to their attachment to Carrier Air Wing Nine. The squadron's nickname is "Wizards" and its radio callsign is "Magic".

Squadron history
There have been two squadrons designated VAQ-133.  The first squadron was established 4 March 1969 at Naval Air Station Alameda, California. The squadron originally flew the EKA-3B Skywarrior. In August 1971, it relocated to NAS Whidbey Island and transitioned to the EA-6B Prowler. That squadron was disestablished in June 1992.
    
The current squadron, Electronic Attack Squadron 133 is the second squadron to use that designation.  It was established on 1 April 1996 as a land based "expeditionary" squadron flying the EA-6B Prowler. In August 2010 it was assigned to Carrier Air Wing 9. It continues to be a carrier based squadron to the present. Following the 2012-2013 deployment of Carrier Air Wing 9 on board , VAQ-133 was reassigned to Carrier Air Wing Eight based aboard . This reassignment was originally slated to occur in January 2014 but changing operational requirements accelerated this reassignment until immediately after the end of the 2012-2013 deployment.  As of mid-2014, VAQ-133 made a transition from the EA-6B to the EA-18G.
In 2018 VAQ-133 embarked on an “Around the World” cruise on board the USS John C. Stennis (CVN 74).  During this deployment they flew their first E/A-18G combat missions into Operations INHERENT RESOLVE and FREEDOM’S SENTINEL.

References

External links
VAQ-133 official website

See also
 History of the United States Navy
 List of United States Navy aircraft squadrons

Military units and formations in Washington (state)
Electronic attack squadrons of the United States Navy